"When You're Not Loving Me" is a song recorded by Canadian country music group Tracey Prescott & Lonesome Daddy. It was released in 1992 as the first single from their debut album, Tracey Prescott & Lonesome Daddy. It peaked at number 8 on the RPM Country Tracks chart in August 1992.

Chart performance

Year-end charts

References

1992 songs
1992 debut singles
Prescott-Brown songs
Columbia Records singles
Songs written by Barry Brown (Canadian musician)